Osamah Sami (born 10 March 1983 in Qom, Iran) is an Australian stage and screen actor, writer, spoken-word artist, and stand-up comedian of Iraqi origin. His critically acclaimed book Good Muslim Boy, was the winner of the 2016 NSW Premier's Literary Award. It was also Highly Commended at the Victorian Premier's Literary Awards that same year.

Sami also co wrote and starred in Ali's Wedding, which earned him an Australian Academy Award for Best Original Screenplay as well as a nomination for Best Lead Actor. This was mirrored at the 2018 Film Critics Circle of Australia Awards in 2018, where he won for Best Script, and was nominated for Best Male Lead. His script also received an Australian Writers Guild Award in the Best Original Film category. The film won the Audience Award for Best Feature Film at the 2017 Sydney Film Festival, and was the winner of The Age Critics Prize at Melbourne International Film Festival.

Osamah has also been nominated for a Green Room Award for Best Male Performer in a Lead Role for Melbourne Theatre Company's I Call My Brothers.

Biography
Sami was born in Iran to Iraqi parents and was cast in several roles on stage in his childhood hometown of Qom.

After immigrating to Australia, he began working with a local theatre group and starred in many productions from then on. His performance in Trial of Saddam, where he played Saddam Hussein, was very successful amongst the Iraqi community in Australia. The play was written by his father. In 2005 he was part of a theatre group that was prevented from entering the United States of America to perform the play.

He has since gone on to work regularly in film, theatre and television. He has been cast in several leading roles; one opposite Claudia Karvan in the telemovie Saved, directed by Tony Ayres. He also played the lead role in the award-winning Dee McLachlan comedy feature, 10 Terrorists! 
His guest roles include TV shows including East West 101, Rush, Sea Patrol, City Homicide, Jack Irish and a regular role in the TV series Kick.

His theatre appearances include Belvoir St. Theatre Company, Melbourne Theatre Company, Queensland Theatre Company, Malthouse Theatre Company, and La Mama.

Osamah writes a poetry blog, with four main categories of: Love, Social Justice, For Dad and War.

In November 2022, it was revealed Sami had co-created and co-written a new drama called House of Gods which will air on ABC TV in 2023. The drama centres around an imam and his family as well as the Australian Arab / Iraqi community he leads, with Sami using his own real life experiences to tell the story of the community of which is a part.

Awards
2018 – Nominated, Australian Film Critics Association, Best Screenplay
2018 – Nominated, Australian Film Critics Association, Best Actor
2018 – Winner, Film Critics Circle of Australia, Best Screenplay
2018 – Nominated, Film Critics Circle of Australia, Best Actor
2017 – Nominated, AACTA Awards, Best Lead Actor in a Feature Film
2017 – Winner, AACTA Awards, Best Original Screenplay
2017 – Winner, Australian Muslim Achievement Awards, Creative Artist of the Year
2017 – Winner, Los Angeles Independent Film Festival Award, Best Web Series
2016 – Winner, AWGIE Award, Best Original Screenplay
2016 – Winner, NSW Premier's Literary Award, Non-Fiction Writing
2016 – Highly Commended, Victorian Premier's Literary Award, Non-Fiction Writing
2016 – Nominated, Green Room Award, Best Lead Actor
2016 – Nominated, L.A Web Fest Outstanding Comedy Series

Filmography

Actor

Feature films
 TBA – Shayda
 2021 – Tennessine
 2020 – The Furnace
 2017 – Ali's Wedding 
 2016 – Journey 
 2012 – 10 Terrorists 
 2009 – Saved
 2007 – Lucky Miles

TV work
 2016 – Jack Irish as Hadji Adhib
 2015 – Two Refugees and a Blonde as Sami
 2011 – Sea Patrol as Salem Shokor
 2010 – City Homicide as Hanif Durrani
 2010 – Rush as Hazrat
 2009 – East West 101 as Latif
 2008 – Canal Road as Michael Young
 2007 – City Homicide as Kasim Al-Basri
 2007 – Kick as Sharif Doumani

Stage
 2021 – Them (Arts Centre Melbourne)
 2020 – The Seagull (La Mama Theatre)
 2019/20 – Anthem (Melbourne Arts Festival/ Perth International Arts Festival/ Sydney Arts Festival)
 2019 – Gilgamesh (Arts House)
 2018 – Good Muslim Boy (Malthouse Theatre/ Queensland Theatre)
 2017 – The Sound of Waiting (Brown's Mart Theatre, Darwin)
 2016 – Tales of a City by the Sea (La Mama Theatre) – remount/ tour
 2015 – I Call My Brothers (Melbourne Theatre Company)
 2014 – Tales of a City by the Sea (La Mama Theatre)
 2014 – The Container (Big West Festival)
 2013 – The Two Executioners (La Mama Theatre)
 2012 – Transit.Origin.Destination (A.P.E Sydney)
 2011 – Black Box 149 (La Mama Theatre)
 2010 – Long Day's Dying (La Mama Theatre)
 2009 – Baghdad Wedding (Belvoir St. Theatre Company)
 2007 – Hombody/ Kabul (Theatre @ Risk)
 2007 – Sinners (La Mamma Theatre)
 2006 – Trial of Saddam (A.A.G)

Writer 
 Good Muslim Boy (Stage)
 Ali's Wedding (Feature Film)
 2 Refugees & A Blonde (Web Series)
 The Bus Stop (Stage)
 From Baghdad to the Burbs (TV Series)

Books
 Good Muslim Boy A memoir, published by Hardie Grant

References

External links
Official Site & Blog

Osamah Sami on Instagram

Living people
1983 births
Iranian emigrants to Australia
Iraqi refugees
Australian male television actors
Iranian male actors
Iraqi male film actors
People from Qom
Australian Shia Muslims
Iranian people of Iraqi descent
Australian male film actors
Australian Muslims
Australian people of Iraqi descent
Australian writers
Iraqi writers
Muslim poets
Iraqi male stage actors
Iraqi male television actors